Marcel Lequatre (29 September 1882 – 14 November 1960) was a Swiss road racing cyclist.

Career
Marcel Lequatre was a professional cyclist during 1902-1919. In 1904 he won the Swiss National Road racing title and in 1906 and 1907 he was the Swiss National Motor-paced racing champion. He holds records winning the ancient Swiss classic races Romanshorn - Genève three times and Bern - Genève four times. In 1906 he also won the Tour du Lac Léman, one of the oldest cycling classics in the world, and in 1908 he ranked sixth in Milan - San Remo

Lequatre started the Tour de France three times: in 1903 in the first tour, as well as in 1907 and 1908. Each time, though, he abandoned the race after a few stages.

References

External links
 Page at CyclingRanking.com

Swiss male cyclists
1882 births
1960 deaths
People from Yverdon-les-Bains
Sportspeople from the canton of Vaud